

Franz Andreas Bauer (later Francis) (14 March 1758 – 11 December 1840) was an Austrian microscopist and botanical artist. 

Born in Feldsberg, Lower Austria (now Valtice, Czech Republic), he was the son of Lucas Bauer (died 1761), court painter to the Prince of Liechtenstein, and brother of the painters Josef Anton (1756–1830) and Ferdinand Bauer (1760–1826). After Lucas Bauer's death, his wife, Therese continued to give her three sons lessons in art and illustration. Josef succeeded his father as court painter and eventually became keeper of the gallery in Vienna.

Francis and Ferdinand acquired their first experience of botanical illustration with the arrival of Father Norbert Boccius, Abbot of Feldsberg, in 1763, and produced over 2000 watercolour drawings of plant specimens under his guidance. They were then employed by Count Dietrichstein as flower painters in Vienna - Franz illustrated works by the Baron Nikolaus Joseph von Jacquin and his son Baron Joseph Franz von Jacquin at the Schönbrunn Imperial Gardens; Franz then accompanied the latter to London. There Jacquin the younger introduced him to Sir Joseph Banks, who, recognizing his extraordinary talent, secured him a position as first botanical illustrator at the Royal Botanic Gardens, Kew and Museum, at an annual salary of £300. He stayed there for the rest of his life, producing a wealth of superb botanical and anatomical illustrations, became a member of the Royal Society and was appointed ‘Botanic Painter to His Majesty' King George III.

By 1790 Bauer had settled in at Kew, and was involved in detailed paintings and drawings of flower dissections, often at microscopic level, and taking great care in the hand-colouring of lithographic copies of his work. During this time he tutored Queen Charlotte, Princess Elizabeth and William Hooker in the art of illustration, and often entertained friends and botanists at his home. He died in 1840, and is buried at St. Anne's Church, Kew, next to Thomas Gainsborough. His legacy is to be found in such sumptuous publications as Delineations of Exotick Plants (1796–1803), his collaboration with John Lindley Illustrations of Orchidaceous Plants (1830–38), and his delicate lithographs in Strelitzia Depicta (1818).

Works illustrated
Delineations of Exotick Plants cultivated in the Royal Garden at Kew. Drawn and coloured and the Botanical characters displayed according to the Linnean System by Francis Bauer. Published by William Aiton, d.c. (Preface by Sir Joseph Banks.) 1796-83
The Genera and Species of Orchidaceous Plants, illustrated by drawings on stone from the sketches of Francis Bauerby John Lindley. London, Ridgways and Treuttel, Wurtz, 1830-1838.
Genera filicum; or Illustrations of the ferns, and other allied genera; from the original coloured drawings of the late Francis Bauer; with additions and descriptive letterpress, by Sir William Jackson Hooker. London, H. G. Bohn, 1842.

Gallery

References

Bibliography
Stewart, Joyce and William T. Stearn.  The orchid paintings of Franz Bauer.  Timber Press,. Portland, Or. 1993
Reinikka, Merle A. A History of the Orchid. Timber Press,. Portland, Or. 1995

External links 

 Drawings by Bauer digitized by the John Carter Brown Library.
  Kew biography of Francis Bauer
 Description of drawings by Bauer at Senate House Library, University of London

1758 births
1840 deaths
People from Valtice
Austrian illustrators
Botanical illustrators
Fellows of the Royal Society
Court painters
Burials at St. Anne's Church, Kew